Port of Wisbech is an inland port on the River Nene in Wisbech, Isle of Ely, Cambridgeshire, United Kingdom. It is mainly used for cargo and industrial purposes, with the southern part of the port housing a number of berths for yachts. Fenland District Council is the harbour authority for most of the River Nene; as well as operating the port and harbour, it provides a Port Health service to commercial ships, leisure craft and fishing vessels. The port runs a fortnightly service from Riga, Latvia importing from the Baltic.

History 
Wisbech was an Anglo-Saxon port on The Wash and continued to serve as a port in medieval times. After the estuary of the River Ouse became silted up, it was diverted into the sea at King's Lynn. This led to the construction of the present course of the River Nene from Peterborough to the Wash. The drained marshes provided rich productive farmland, bringing prosperity to the port of Wisbech from the regular shipments of corn and oil seed rape to the coast and continent, and imports which included coal from the North, slate from Wales and timber from the Baltic. Woad (Isatis tinctoria) was shipped out from the port.
At its peak over 200 vessels were registered to the port.

Operations 
Approx annual tonnage: 800,000. Connections to major transport links - A17, A47 east coast to A1/M1 carriageway. The port runs a fortnightly service from Riga, Latvia importing from the Baltic.

Further reading

References

External links 
 Port of Wisbech Official website

Wisbech
Wisbech
River Nene